The 2009 BMW PGA Championship was the 55th edition of the BMW PGA Championship, an annual professional golf tournament on the European Tour. It was held 21–24 May at the West Course of Wentworth Club in Virginia Water, Surrey, England, a suburb southwest of London.

Englishman Paul Casey won his first BMW PGA Championship with a one stroke victory over fellow Englishman Ross Fisher. This result saw him rise to Number 3 in the Official World Golf Rankings.

Course layout

Past champions in the field 
Nine former champions entered the tournament.

Made the cut

Missed the cut

Nationalities in the field

Round summaries

First round 
Thursday, 21 May 2009

Second round 
Friday, 22 May 2009

Third round 
Saturday, 23 May 2009

Final round 
Sunday, 24 May 2009

References 

BMW PGA Championship
Golf tournaments in England
BMW PGA Championship
BMW PGA Championship
BMW PGA Championship